Tusquittee (originally Tusquitee) is an unincorporated community located in Clay County, North Carolina, United States. Tusquitee is a Cherokee Indian word meaning "Where the water-dogs laughed" (A Water Dog, sometimes also called mud-puppy, is a type of salamander). It is bordered on the north by Fires Creek Bear Reserve, which is within the Nantahala National Forest. The Tusquitee Mountain range includes Tusquitee Bald at 5,240 feet.

"Where the water-dogs laughed"
According to folklore, a Cherokee hunter crossing over Tusquitee Bald in a very dry season, heard voices, and creeping silently toward the place from which the sound proceeded, peeped over a rock and saw two water-dogs walking together on their hind legs along the trail and talking as they went. Their pond had dried up and they were on the way over to Nantahala river. As he listened one said to the other, "Where's the water? I'm so thirsty that my apron (gills) hangs down," and then both water-dogs laughed.

There is a subdivision in Tusquittee called Tusquittee Landing which incorporates a 2700 foot grass airstrip. Most people assume the "Landing" refers to the airplanes landing. However, it actually is a carryover from the days where the mules dragged logs down from the forest to a landing on Goldmine Creek. The logs were then moved down the creek to Tusquittee Creek and eventually to the sawmill.

Unincorporated communities in North Carolina
Unincorporated communities in Clay County, North Carolina